Tavernor Knott WSA (occasionally written Taverner Knott) (1816–1890) was a Scottish portrait and genre artist. He was the paternal uncle of Cargill Gilston Knott.

Life

He was born in Aberdeen in 1816 the son of John Knott (b.1754), a music teacher, and his wife Sophia Pelham. His family (including a sister Sophia M. Knott and brother Lavernor Knott) appear to have moved to 2 St Patrick Square in Edinburgh around 1830.

In 1839 Knott is listed as a portrait painter living at 2 St Patrick Square in Edinburgh's South Side. As the main householder it must be presumed that his father was now dead.
On 3 May 1878 he is listed as a Master Mason of the Humber Lodge, at that date being affiliated also as a member of the Celtic Lodge (2 Brodie's Close on the Lawnmarket).
On 1 December 1879 a page in William Gladstone’s diary indicates that he wrote to Tavernor Knott from Taymouth Castle shortly before visiting Edinburgh. This appears to have led to a commission as a portrait of Gladstone is amongst his known works.

In later life Tavernor's address was 32 York Place in Edinburgh's First New Town.

Historical Compositions
See

 Settlers in the New World (1841)
 Indian Encounter (1841)
 Scottish Emigrants Halting in the Prairie (1841)

References

1816 births
1890 deaths
19th-century Scottish painters
Scottish Freemasons
Scottish male painters
Scottish portrait painters
19th-century Scottish male artists